The  is a professional golf tournament on the Japan Golf Tour, and is one of the tour's four major championships. It was founded in 1926, making it one of the oldest professional tournaments in Japan, and is played at a variety of courses throughout the country. The purse for the 2017 event was ¥150,000,000, with ¥30,000,000 going to the winner.

Between 2009 and 2017, the tournament was title sponsored by Nissin Foods.

Winners

Notes

References

External links

Coverage on Japan Golf Tour's official site
Japan PGA list of winners 

Japan Golf Tour events
Golf tournaments in Japan
Recurring sporting events established in 1926
1926 establishments in Japan